Khalaj is a village in Kharqan Rural District, in the Central District of Razan County, Hamadan Province, Iran. At the 2006 census, its population was 242, in 68 families.

References 

Populated places in Razan County